is a Japanese racing manga series written and illustrated by Michiharu Kusunoki. It was first serialized in Shogakukan's Big Comic Spirits in 1990, but was later serialized in Kodansha's Weekly Young Magazine from 1992 to 2008. The manga was compiled into 42 volumes published by Kodansha. A second manga series titled Wangan Midnight: C1 Runner was published from 2008 to 2012. A third manga series, Ginkai no Speed Star, was published from 2014 to 2015. A fourth manga series, Shutoko SPL - Ginkai no Speedster, started in 2016.

The series has been adapted into several live action feature films, video games, and an anime television series. The anime was broadcast in Japan from June 2007 to September 2008 on the anime satellite television network Animax, animated by A.C.G.T and produced by OB Planning.

In 1999, Wangan Midnight won the Kodansha Manga Award for the General category.

Story 
The series revolves around street racing on Tokyo's , as well as other roads on the Shuto Expressway network. The story begins with high school student Akio Asakura encountering a black Porsche 911 Turbo nicknamed "Blackbird" on the Wangan. Akio attempts to give chase, but is unable to keep up with the Blackbird, which is driven by a medical doctor named Tatsuya Shima.

Determined to drive a faster car, Akio visits a junkyard and is drawn to an old blue Nissan Fairlady Z (S30) with a highly tuned L28 engine. He learns that the car is supposedly "cursed," being extremely difficult to drive and having a history of multiple accidents, earning it the name . However, this does not dissuade him, and he restores the car back to its former glory. When racing with Blackbird, Akio tries to win, only to crash his Nissan multiple times. He also gets to meet Eriko Asakura, the sister of the original driver who shares the same name as the current Akio, who previously died in a car accident while racing with Blackbird.

As he develops his career as the infamous owner of the Devil Z, Akio meets many other racers and tuners along the way, such as fashion model and TV host Reina Akikawa, who drives a grey (later white) Nissan Skyline GT-R R32, and Jun Kitami, the original creator of the infamous Devil Z and Blackbird. The central plot revolves around the rivalry between the Devil Z and Blackbird for Wangan superiority as Akio tries to remain his loyalty with the car and control it from crashing, with other racers trying to compete against both of them who are also seeking to oust their record.

The new story arc, Wangan Midnight: C1 Runner, features the new adventures of a new main character, Shinji Ogishima (who debuted in the last chapters of the original manga), and his friend, Nobu Setoguchi. They are part of the GT Cars project, which is in dispute and conflict, and must drive Mazda RX-7's along Shuto Expressway to settle these problems along with meeting Tatsuya Shima.

Characters 
 

An ambitious racer who started when he was very young, Akio was in his final year of high school as the story began. He drove a red Nissan Fairlady Z (Z31) until, after being defeated by Tatsuya Shima's Blackbird, he discovers the "Devil Z," a  Nissan Fairlady Z (S30) which is supernaturally fast and extremely difficult to drive. Akio is regarded as a legend on the Wangan, though he is a humble character.
 

A doctor and Akio's main rival, as Akio is the only one who regularly gives him a challenge. He drives a black Porsche 911 Turbo (930), nicknamed "Blackbird", in homage to the RUF CTR Yellowbird, RUF's 911 counterpart.

Reina is a model and television host, co-hosting an automotive news show named Drive Go Go!. She finds Akio on the Wangan and becomes obsessed with him and the Devil Z, even trying to take the Devil Z for a joyride one night. After getting her Nissan Skyline GT-R (R32) tuned and modified from YM Speed's Kazuhiko Yamamoto, she discovers a love for street racing (something that does not sit very well with her manager). Though formerly a competing rival, she becomes friends with Akio after crashing her Skyline whilst racing him, even developing feelings for him. As a result, Reina just spectates the races on sidelines while driving her R32 or just coming with Akio to see him race.

Media

Manga 
Wangan Midnight is written and illustrated by Michiharu Kusunoki. The series was first briefly published in Shogakukan's Big Comic Spirits in 1990 and transferred to Kodansha's Weekly Young Magazine, where it ran from 1992 to 2008. Kodansha collected its chapters in forty-two tankōbon volumes, published from January 8, 1993, to December 26, 2008.

A second series, titled Wangan Midnight: C1 Runner, was serialized in Weekly Young Magazine from August 4, 2008, to July 9, 2012. Kodansha collected its chapters in twelve tankōbon volumes, published between November 6, 2009, and October 5, 2012.

A third series, titled Ginkai no Speed Star, was serialized in Big Comic Spirits from August 11, 2014, to April 13, 2015. Shogakukan collected its chapters in two tankōbon volumes, published on November 28, 2014, and May 29, 2015.

A fourth series, titled  Shutoko SPL - Ginkai no Speedster, started in Kodansha's Monthly Young Magazine on September 20, 2016. Kodansha has collected its chapters into individual tankōbon volumes. The first volume was published on January 5, 2018. As of September 17, 2021, seven volumes have been released.

Films 

The series was adapted into a series of direct-to-video movies in 1991, 1993, 1994, 1998, 2001, and 2009:

 Wangan Midnight (湾岸MidNight), 1991
 Wangan Midnight II (湾岸ミッドナイトII), 1993
 Wangan Midnight III (湾岸ミッドナイトIII), 1993
 Wangan Midnight 4 (湾岸ミッドナイト4), 1993
 Wangan Midnight Special Director's Cut Complete Edition (湾岸ミッドナイトスペシャル ディレクターズカット完全版), 1994
 Wangan Midnight Final: GT-R Legend – Act 1 (湾岸ミッドナイト FINAL ~GT-R伝説 ACT1~), 1994
 Wangan Midnight Final: GT-R Legend – Act 2 (湾岸ミッドナイト FINAL ~GT-R伝説 ACT2~), 1994
 Devil GT-R Full Tuning (魔王GT-R チューニングのすべて), 1994
 Showdown! Devil GT-R (対決!魔王GT-R), 1994
 Wangan Midnight S30 vs. Gold GT-R – Part I (新湾岸ミッドナイト S30vsゴールドGT-R Part I), 1998
 Wangan Midnight S30 vs. Gold GT-R – Part II (新湾岸ミッドナイト S30vsゴールドGT-R Part II), 1998
 Wangan Midnight Return (湾岸ミッドナイト リターン), 2001
 Wangan Midnight The Movie (湾岸MidNight Movie), 2009

Anime 

At the 2007 Tokyo Anime Fair, OB Planning announced the production of an animated series based on the manga, and aired on a pay-per-view channel of Animax in June 2007. The series was co-produced by OB Planning, A.C.G.T., and Pastel, under the direction of Tsuneo Tominaga. The anime consists of twenty-six episodes. The opening theme for the series is "Lights and Anymore" by TRF and the ending theme is "Talkin' Bout Good Days" by Mother Ninja.

Video games 
 Wangan Midnight – Developed by Genki and released on February 2, 2001 for arcade.
 Wangan Midnight R – Released for arcade on December 20, 2001 and for the PlayStation 2 on March 21, 2002.
 Wangan Midnight – Released in 2007 for the PlayStation 3, and PlayStation Portable (as Wangan Midnight Portable) platforms. The PS3 and PSP games were re-released in 2008, under the "Genki The Best" label.
 Wangan Midnight Maximum Tune – Developed by Bandai Namco Amusement and released on July 6, 2004 for arcade.
Wangan Midnight Maximum Tune 2 – Released on April 25, 2005 for arcade.
Wangan Midnight Maximum Tune 3 – Released on July 18, 2007 for arcade.
Wangan Midnight Maximum Tune 3 DX – Released on December 16, 2008 for arcade.
Wangan Midnight Maximum Tune 3 DX Plus – Released on March 4, 2010 for arcade.
Wangan Midnight Maximum Tune 4 – Released on December 15, 2011 for arcade.
Wangan Midnight Maximum Tune 5 – Released on March 12, 2014 for arcade.
Wangan Midnight Maximum Tune 5 DX – Released on December 15, 2015 for arcade.
Wangan Midnight Maximum Tune 5 DX Plus – Released on December 15, 2016 for arcade.
Wangan Midnight Maximum Tune 6 – Released on July 12, 2018 for arcade.
Wangan Midnight Maximum Tune 6R – Released on January 21, 2020 for arcade for Japan only.
Wangan Midnight Maximum Tune 6RR – Released on November 17, 2021 for arcade.

Reception
In 1999, Wangan Midnight won the Kodansha Manga Award for the General category.

Notes

References

External links 
 News on the Wangan Midnight Maximum Tune series
 

1990 manga
1991 films
1993 films
1994 films
1998 films
2001 films
2007 anime television series debuts
2008 manga
2014 manga
2016 manga
Japanese auto racing films
Animated television series about auto racing
Animax original programming
Kodansha manga
Manga adapted into films
Live-action films based on manga
Motorsports in anime and manga
Seinen manga
Sharp Point Press titles
Shogakukan manga
Tokyo in fiction
Video game franchises
Video game franchises introduced in 2001
Winner of Kodansha Manga Award (General)
Video games scored by Yuzo Koshiro
1990s Japanese films
2000s Japanese films